The Cupa României Final was the final match of the 2014–15 Cupa României, played between Universitatea Cluj and Steaua București. Steaua București won the match 3–0.

Match

External links
 Official site 

2015
2014–15 in Romanian football
FC Steaua București matches
FC Universitatea Cluj matches